Hills, Dales and The Vinyard is a historic home located at Keedysville, Washington County, Maryland, United States. It is a two-story late 18th century log house, with an early 19th-century stone addition. The property also includes stone retaining walls, stone fences, a stone bank barn foundation, and a late 19th-century timber framed corn crib.

Hills, Dales and The Vinyard was listed on the National Register of Historic Places in 2000.

References

External links
, including photo from 2000, at Maryland Historical Trust

Houses on the National Register of Historic Places in Maryland
Houses in Washington County, Maryland
Houses completed in 1790
National Register of Historic Places in Washington County, Maryland